Coming of Age is a 1984 Australian film. It is now known as a very hard to find film which is highly sought after by collectors and lovers of Australian films.

Seasoned Australian softcore porn actress Angela Menzies-Wills plays the lead role of Angel.

References

External links

Australian comedy films
Films shot in Melbourne
1980s English-language films
1984 films
1984 comedy films
1980s Australian films